USS Edith may refer to the following ships of the United States Navy:

 , a screw steamer in commission during 1849
 , a cargo ship in commission from 1918 to 1919
 , a patrol vessel in commission from 1917 to 1919
 , a patrol vessel in commission from 1917 to 1919

References 

United States Navy ship names